The Republic of Manitobah was a short-lived, unrecognized state founded in June 1867 by Thomas Spence at the town of Portage la Prairie in what is now the Canadian province of Manitoba.

History 

In the mid-19th century, the future province of Manitoba was still part of Rupert's Land, a territory owned by the Hudson's Bay Company (HBC).

By 1858, the population of the Portage community had developed to the point where the necessity of municipal corporation became evident. As Portage la Prairie had no government, laws or taxation at the time, Spence and a group of local settlers formed a provisional government  in January 1868, first calling it the Republic of Caledonia before changing the name later to the Republic of Manitobah, after a local lake. The following month, Spence and his group wrote to the British Colonial Office asking for the republic to be recognized as a political entity, but there was no reply.

Demise 

The republic never had clearly defined borders, and could not persuade local HBC traders to pay their taxes. By late spring 1868, the republic had been informed by the Colonial Office in London that its government had no power. The republic's problems were compounded by misappropriation of tax funds, and a botched treason trial. The Republic of Manitobah collapsed before it had a chance to blossom.

Thomas Spence served in the council for Louis Riel’s provisional government, whose actions led to the formation of the Province of Manitoba within Canada on July 15, 1870.

Legacy 
Thomas Spence was the first person to use the word Manitoba in reference to both the lake and surrounding territory; so, while the government dissolved, the name Manitoba remains to this day.

The story of the Republic of Manitobah was made into a humorous animated short, called Spence's Republic, by the National Film Board of Canada in 1978, as a part of the Canada Vignettes series.

References

External links
Manitoba Historical Society article on the Republic of Manitobah
IMDb entry for Spence's Republic

Former territorial entities in North America
History of Manitoba
Separatism in Canada
1867 establishments in North America
1868 disestablishments in North America
Manitobah
Manitobah
Portage la Prairie